Orange Grove is a suburb of Perth, Western Australia in the City of Gosnells.

Despite the name, Bickley Dam is situated within Orange Grove. It was constructed in 1921 on Bickley Brook, a tributary of the Canning River.

It is a source of drinking water for the Integrated Water Supply System (IWSS) which services Perth, Mandurah, Pinjarra, Harvey and the Goldfields and Agricultural regions. It was used as a direct source of water for Perth until 1994. Since 1994, however, it has operated as a pumpback for Victoria Reservoir due to low pipeline pressure and poor water quality.

References

External links

Suburbs of Perth, Western Australia
Suburbs in the City of Gosnells